The 2023 IHF World Men's Handball Championship was the 28th such event hosted by the International Handball Federation. It was held in Poland and Sweden from 11 to 29 January 2023.

Denmark were the two-times defending champions, having won the 2019 and 2021 editions, and successfully defended their title by defeating France 34–29 in the final. In doing so, Denmark became the first men's national handball team to win three consecutive world titles. Spain beat the hosts and European champions Sweden to win a World Championship bronze medal for the third time, the second in consecutive editions.

Bidding process 
Eight nations initially expressed interest in hosting the tournament:

 
 
 
 
 
 
 
 

However until the bidding phase expired on 15 April 2015 only three nations entered documents to bid for this event. On 21 April 2015 it was announced that Poland and Sweden had agreed intentions to jointly hosting this tournament:

 
  and 

A decision was scheduled for 4 June 2015, but the Congress was moved to 6 November 2015. Poland and Sweden were chosen as the hosts. This is the first time Poland participate as the host country at a IHF World Men's Handball Championship.

Venues 
The tournament took place in nine cities (four in Poland and five in Sweden): Kraków, Gdańsk, Katowice, Płock, Stockholm, Malmö, Gothenburg, Jönköping and Kristianstad. The opening game took place in Katowice while the final will take place in Stockholm.

Marketing 
The logo was unveiled on 23 August 2021. The logo was designed to be used on a dark blue background, but it may also stand alone. The logo synthetically presents a flying ball. It was inspired by a comet lighting up the sky. The symbol conveys dynamism and expression. The trails form a hand which, in combination with a ball in the foreground, create a characteristic and friendly graphic form. The logo's colors refer to the national colors of Poland and Sweden, the organizers of the Men's World Championship 2023. It carries a clear message about the sports discipline of handball. A skillful and well-balanced color split alludes to the cooperation of the event hosts and sticking together for the success of the Championship. The logo was designed by Polish design agency Studio Signature. The slogan: Stick Together was unveiled on 15 September 2021. The concept "Stick together" is the framework for all our communication and is the sender in all posts or other expressions coming from the 28th IHF Men's World Championship Poland/Sweden 2023. We use "Stick together" to talk about the big questions and the broader context, but we also use "Stick together" locally in all marketing in each host city. It symbolizes by each concept:

Stick together for fair play.
Stick together as fans.
Stick together as a team.
Stick together to challenge.
Stick together in the arena.
Stick together to win.

It is also as part of both countries sustainability and capable communication concepts.

Qualification 
The World Championship hosts qualified directly, along with the reigning world champions.
Following the current IHF rules
, the number of compulsory places awarded to each continental confederation is divided as follows: 4 places each for Africa, Asia and Europe. Because there is more than one organiser from the same Continental Confederation (Europe), the number of compulsory places of the respective Continental Confederation were reduced accordingly. So only 3 compulsory places for Europe, while Africa and Asia were kept with 4 four places allocated. Starting in 2021 Pan America was split into two zones: the North America and Caribbean Zone having 1 place, and the South and Central America Zone having 3 places.
One additional place were available for Oceania, but only when that region's national team ranked fifth or higher at the Asian Championship. Since no Oceania team placed among the top five at the Asian Championship, the IHF awarded an additional wild card.
In addition, several performance places were awarded for the continental confederations (12 places), which were based on the teams ranked 1–12 in the preceding World Championship.
Taking into consideration the results of the 2021 Men's World Championship, 20 out of 32 places were distributed as follows:

1All hosting federations are automatically entitled to take part in the World Championship. If there is more than one organiser from the same Continental Confederation, the number of compulsory places of the respective Continental Confederation shall be reduced accordingly. If there is more than one organiser and the organisers are not from the same Continental Confederation, the IHF Council shall decide about the reduction of the compulsory places, considering only the compulsory places of the Continental Confederations involved.
2The reigning World Champion automatically qualifies for the next World Championship and, as a rule, is placed first in the first performance row. In case the reigning World Champion is also hosting the next World Championship, the Continental Confederation of the reigning World Champion obtains one additional performance place.
3The compulsory place for Oceania is subject to fulfilling certain conditions. The Continental Confederation of Oceania does not have a direct compulsory place for a Continental Confederation qualification event. The Continental Confederation of Oceania is invited to participate in the Asian qualification events. The compulsory place is awarded to Oceania if the representative from Oceania is ranked 5th or higher in the Asian qualification. If Oceania fails to rank 5th or does not participate, the IHF Council will award this place as a free wild card.
4The wild card shall be awarded by the IHF Council.

Qualified teams 

5 Bold indicates champion for that year
6 Italic indicates host country for that year
7 From both German teams only East Germany was qualified in 1990

Draw 
The draw took place on 2 July 2022 at the Polish National Radio Symphony Orchestra in Katowice.

Seeding 
Following ranking of previous World Championship, and following IHF rules.

Groups 
Each host country could assign one qualified team to each host city. Therefore Spain played in group A (Krakow), Norway in group F (Krakow), and Denmark in group H (Malmö). Germany in group E (Katowice), Iceland in group D (Kristianstad) and Croatia in group G (Jönköping).

Referees 
The referee pairs were selected on 16 November 2022.

Squads

Preliminary round 
All times are local (UTC+1).

Group A

Group B

Group C

Group D

Group E

Group F

Group G

Group H

President's Cup

Group I

Group II

31st place game

29th place game

27th place game

25th place game

Main round

Group I 
Results between advancing teams from Group A and Group B were carried over.

Group II 
Results between advancing teams from Group C and Group D were carried over.

Group III 
Results between advancing teams from Group E and Group F were carried over.

Group IV 

Results between advancing teams from Group G and Group H were carried over.

Final round

Bracket

5–8th place playoffs

Quarterfinals

5–8th place semifinals

Semifinals

Seventh place game

Fifth place game

Third place game

Final

Final ranking and awards

Final ranking 
Places 1 to 8 and 25 to 32 were decided by play-off or knock-out. Teams finishing third in the main round were ranked 9th to 12th, teams finishing fourth in the main round 13th to 16th, teams finishing fifth in the main round 17th to 20th and teams ranked sixth 21st to 24th. In case of a tie in points gained, the goal difference of the main round were taken into account, then number of goals scored. If teams were still be equal, number of points gained in the preliminary round were considered followed by the goal difference and then number of goals scored in the preliminary round.

All-star Team 
The All-star Team was announced on 29 January 2023.

Statistics

Top goalscorers

Top goalkeepers

Broadcasters 

 Source:

Notes

References

External links 
 Official website
 IHF website

2023 Men
World Men's Handball Championship
World Men's Handball Championship
World Men's Handball Championship
International handball competitions hosted by Poland
International handball competitions hosted by Sweden
January 2023 sports events in Poland
January 2023 sports events in Sweden
Events at Malmö Arena